The 2017 Caguas Sporting FC season is the club's second season of existence. The club will play in the Puerto Rico Soccer League, the first tier of the Puerto Rico soccer pyramid.

Pre-season

Don Bosco Cup
The 2017 Caguas Sporting FC team will be participating in the Don Bosco Cup as preseason.

Matches

PRSL

Matches

Copa Luis Villarejo 

The 2017 Copa Luis Villarejo schedule has not been announced.

References